Julia Lajos (24 February 1894 – 21 June 1963) was a Spanish film actress. She appeared in more than 50 films between 1926 and 1963.

Selected filmography

 A Palace for Sale (1942)
 Orosia (1943)
 Lady in Ermine (1943)
 Life Begins at Midnight (1944)
 The Tower of the Seven Hunchbacks (1944)
 The Road to Babel (1945)
 Bamboo (1945)
 Lady in Ermine (1947)
 The Faith (1947)
 Guest of Darkness (1948)
 Rumbo (1949)
 Just Any Woman (1949)
 Apollo Theatre (1950)
 The Troublemaker (1950)
 The Last Horse (1950)
 Don Juan (1950)
 My Beloved Juan (1950)
 Service at Sea (1951)
 Captain Poison (1951)
 The Great Galeoto (1951)
 Nobody Will Know (1953)
 Doña Francisquita (1953)
 Malvaloca (1954)
 High Fashion (1954)
 The Cock Crow (1955)

External links

1894 births
1963 deaths
Spanish film actresses
20th-century Spanish actresses
Actresses from Castile and León